Parrilla may refer to:

 La Parrilla, a municipality in the province of Valladolid, Castile and León, Spain
 La Parrilla mine, a source of tungsten
 Parrilla (torture), a style of torture involving a metal frame that takes its name from the grill
 a style of grill used for cooking asado (barbecue), commonly found in Latin America, particularly Mexico, Argentina, Venezuela, Colombia, Chile, Uruguay and Paraguay

People

 Bolívar Urrutia Parrilla (1918-2005), soldier and president of Panama
 Bruno Rodríguez Parrilla (born 1958), Cuban diplomat and politician
 David Sanchez Parrilla (born 1978), Spanish footballer
 Diego Ortiz Parrilla, Governor of Coahuila, Viceroyalty of New Spain 1764–1765
 Gonzalo Fernández Parrilla (active from 2006), Spanish scholar and translator of Arabic literature
 José Parrilla (born 1972), American middle distance runner
 Lana Parrilla (born 1977), American actress
 Sam Parrilla (1943-1994), Puerto Rican baseball player

See also
 Parilla (disambiguation)
 Parrillas, a municipality in the province of Toledo, Castile-La Mancha, Spain
 Parrillas One, a football team based in San Pedro Sula, Cortés, Honduras
 Estadio Parrillas One, a football stadium in La Lima, Honduras
 Perilla (disambiguation)
 San Lorenzo de la Parrilla, a municipality in the province of Cuenca, Castile-La Mancha, Spain
 

Surnames of Spanish origin